The 2017 Presidents Cup was the 12th edition of the Presidents Cup golf competition, played at Liberty National Golf Club in Jersey City, New Jersey, from September 28 to October 1, 2017. Steve Stricker and Nick Price were the captains of the U.S. and the International teams, respectively.

The United States were the defending champions and retained the trophy.

President Trump presented U.S. Captain Steve Stricker with the trophy. He became the first Incumbent U.S President to do so.

Course layout
Liberty National Golf Club

For this Presidents Cup only, the matches begin on what is normally the 5th hole at Liberty National. The order of the holes remain the same, culminating on what is normally the 4th hole.

Format
The first two days consist of five matches of foursomes and five matches of fourball. The third day consists of four matches of foursomes and four matches of fourball. The host team captain decides the order, fourball vs. foursomes, on the first three days. On the fourth and final day, twelve singles matches will be played. Thirty matches will be played in all. All matches that are all-square after 18 holes will score  point for each team.

Team qualification and selection
Both teams have 12 players.

United States team
The United States team features the 10 players who earned the most official FedExCup points from the 2015 BMW Championship through to the 2017 Dell Technologies Championship, with points earned in the calendar year 2017 counting double, and two captain's picks. Points for events in the FedEx Cup Playoffs are weighted the same as WGC events. The captain's picks were announced on September 6, 2017.

The final standings were:

International team
The International team features the top 10 players in the Official World Golf Ranking at the conclusion of the 2017 Dell Technologies Championship and two captain's picks. The captain's picks were announced on September 6, 2017.

The final standings were:

Teams

Captains
Steve Stricker is captain of the U.S. team, and Nick Price is captain of the International team.

Fred Couples, Davis Love III, Tiger Woods and Jim Furyk are captain's assistants for the U.S. team, and Ernie Els, Tony Johnstone, Geoff Ogilvy and Mike Weir are captain's assistants for the International team.

Players

Captain's picks shown in yellow
Ages as of September 28; OWGR as of September 25, the last ranking before the Cup

Notables
Jhonattan Vegas became the first Venezuelan to play in the Presidents Cup. Phil Mickelson has played in all twelve Presidents Cups.

Thursday's foursomes matches
Rickie Fowler and Justin Thomas won the first point of the day in convincing fashion, winning 8 out of the 14 holes they played. Patrick Reed and Jordan Spieth continued their dominating play as teammates, winning 5 & 4. Matt Kuchar and Dustin Johnson followed up by winning their match 1 up, the first to reach the full 18 holes and the third American point of the day, guaranteeing a United States lead after day one. The International team gained their first point of the day with the South African duo of Branden Grace and Louis Oosthuizen beating Americans Brooks Koepka and Daniel Berger, 3 & 1. The final match, between Americans Kevin Kisner and Phil Mickelson and Australians Jason Day and Marc Leishman, was halved, giving the Americans a 3 to 1 lead heading into the second day of competition.

Friday's fourball matches
The Americans started the day leading 3 to 1. Both the American and International squads kept three of the same groupings from Thursday foursomes: Oosthuizen/Grace, Day/Leishman, Scott/Vegas, Spieth/Reed, Fowler/Thomas, and Mickelson/Kisner with one match being a rematch of Day/Leishman versus Mickelson/Kisner from day 1. All four players who sat out Thursday played on Friday. Kevin Chappell and Charley Hoffman were paired together, while the International squad put Adam Hadwin with Matsuyama and Anirban Lahiri with Schwartzel.

Saturday's matches

Morning foursomes

Afternoon fourball

Sunday's singles matches

Individual player records
Each entry refers to the win–loss–half record of the player.

United States

International

References

External links

2017
2017 Presidents Cup
2017 in golf
2017 in American sports
2017 in sports in New Jersey
September 2017 sports events in the United States
October 2017 sports events in the United States